Gadao is a legendary chief of the village of Inarajan in southern Guam. In the Chamorro language of ancient Guam, he would have had the title maga'lahi as a high-ranking male. In addition to being featured in legend, he is the namesake of Inarajan's Chief Gadao's Cave containing ancient cave paintings. Some stories claim Gadao himself drew the figures.

Legends 
Two legends featuring Chief Gadao include the Legend of the Three Feats of Strength and the Legend of the Battle Between Chiefs. The legends and their specifics vary.

In the Legend of the Three Feats of Strength, Gadao traveled to Humatak to help its starving people. Some proposed that Gadao become their leader to protect them from foreign threats. For the villagers to accept him as their ruler, Gadao was given three impossible tasks: 1. to swim multiple times around the island without stopping, 2. to crack and grate coconuts with his bare hands, and 3. to level the highest peak on the island. Gadao succeeded and ordered his sons to construct a fence around the island using boulders before daybreak. However, Gadao's sons mistook a twinkling star for the rising sun and rushed home, leaving a boulder in the reef. The foreigners then came and conquered the island.

The Legend of the Battle Between Chiefs tells of an encounter between Gadao and Chief Mataquana. Mataquana was considered one of the strongest chiefs in Guam. When he heard of Gadao's strength, he went to Inarajan and asked someone where he could find Gadao: Mataquana wanted to prove that he was the strongest chief of Guam. Unbeknownst to Mataquana, he was speaking to Gadao. Gadao said that he would introduce Mataquana to Gadao after he rested and ate. When Gadao broke open coconuts with his small finger and wrung them with his hands, Mataquana was impressed at his strength and feared that Gadao's would be greater. Mataquana asked Gadao for the way back home. Each man rowed back to their villages in canoes.

Other chiefs of Guam
 Kepuha
 Matå'pang
 Hurao

See also
Micronesian mythology
Villages of Guam
Hagåtña
Tumon
Gadao's cave

References

External links and references
Legends of Guam
Chief Gadao Photos
Kanton Tasi
Bista Guam

Gadao